Sweden women's national goalball team is the women's national team of Sweden. Goalball is a team sport designed specifically for athletes with a vision impairment.  The team takes part in international goalball competitions.

Paralympic Games

1992 Barcelona 

The team competed in the 1992 Summer Paralympics, from 3 to 14 September 1992, in the Pavelló de la Vall d'Hebron indoor stadium, Barcelona, Spain.  They finished fourth.

1996 Atlanta 

The team competed in the 1996 Summer Paralympics, from 16 to 25 August 1996, in the GSU Sports Arena building, Atlanta, Georgia, United States of America.  The team finished fifth.

2000 Sydney 

The team competed in the 2000 Summer Paralympics, between 18 to 29 October 2000, at an Olympic Park indoor hall,  Sydney, New South Wales, Australia.  They finished third.

2008 Beijing 

The team competed in 2008 Summer Paralympics, from 6 to 17 September 2008, in the Beijing Institute of Technology Gymnasium 'bat wing' arena, Beijing, China.  There were 12 men's teams and 8 women's teams taking part in this sport.

2012 London 

The team competed in the 2012 Summer Paralympics from 30 August to 7 September 2012, in the Copper Box Arena, London, England.  In Group B, they came third, before going into the quarter-finals where they defeated Great Britain 2:1.  They lost to Japan in the semi-finals, 3:4, to take the bronze medal.

Quarter-finals

Semi-finals

Finals

World championships

1994 Colorado Springs 

The team competed in the 1994 World Championships, in Colorado Springs, Colorado, United States of America.  The team was one of nine teams participating, and they finished third overall.

1998 Madrid 

The team competed in the 1998 World Championships, in Madrid, Spain.   The team was one of eleven teams participating, and they finished second overall.

2002 Rio de Janeiro 

The team competed in the 2002 World Championships, in Rio de Janeiro, Brazil, from 30 August 2002 to 8 September 2002.   The team was one of ten teams participating, and they finished fifth overall.

2014 Espoo 

The team competed in the 2014 World Championships from 30 June to 5 July 2014, in Espoo, Finland.  In Pool Y, the team lost to Ukraine 2:6, Brazil 2:7, Israel 6:11, Australia 1:4, but beat China 7:2.

2018 Malmö 

As the host nation, the team competed in the 2018 World Championships from 3 to 8 June 2018, in Baltiska Hallen, Malmö, Sweden.  They placed sixth in Pool C, and twelfth in overall final standings.

IBSA World Games

2003 Quebec City 

The team competed in the 2003 IBSA World Games from 1 to 10 April 2011, in Quebec City, Canada.  Ten teams competed.  The first stage was pool play with five teams per pool and the top two teams in each pool advancing to the next round.

2007 São Paulo 

The team competed in the 2003 IBSA World Games, from 28 July 2007 to 8 August 2007, in São Paulo, Brazil.  The women's goalball competition included thirteen teams, including this one.  The competition was a 2008 Summer Paralympics qualifying event. Malin Gustausson finished second in the competition in scoring with 26 points. Josefine Jálmestal was seventh in the competition in scoring with 13 points.

Regional championships 

The team competes in the IBSA Europe goalball region.  Groups A and C are held one year, and Group B the following year.  Strong teams move towards Group A.

2005 Neerpelt 

The team competed in the 2015 IBSA European Regional Championships, from 15 to 23 October 2005, in Neerpelt and Overpelt, Belgium.  Organised by the Vlaamse Liga Gehandicaptensport vzw (Flemish Sport Federation for Persons with a Disability), it hosted the men's Groups A and B (Belgium, Czech Republic, Denmark, Finland, Germany, Great Britain, Hungary, Italy, Lithuania, Slovakia, Slovenia, Spain, Sweden, and Ukraine), and the women division (Belarus, Denmark, Finland, Germany, Great Britain, Greece, Netherlands, Spain, Sweden, and Ukraine).  Games were held in the Provinciaal Domein Dommelhof Sport in Neerpelt, and Sportcentrum De Bemvoort in Overpelt.

With ten teams competing, the team finished seventh.

2007 Antalya 

The team competed at the 2007 IBSA Goalball European Championships, hosted by the Turkish Blind Sports Federation, in Antalya, Turkey with 11 teams contesting the women's competition. The team finished sixth.

2009 Munich (Group A) 

The team competed at the 2009 European Championships, in Munich, Germany, with eleven teams taking part.  Sweden finished fifth.

2013 Konya (Group A) 

The team competed in the 2013 IBSA Goalball European Championships, Group A, from 1 to 11 November 2013, at Konya, Turkey, where they finished tenth.

2015 Kaunas (Group A) 

The team competed in the 2015 IBSA Goalball European A Championships in Kaunas, Lithuania.  They lost to Turkey, 0:5 in the quarter-finals.

2017 Pajulahti (Group A) 

The team competed in the 2017 IBSA Goalball European A Championships from 15 to 23 September 2017, at Pajulahti, Nastola, Finland.  Athletes included  Viktoria Andersson, Rebekka Krebs, Lisa Ly, and Maria Wåglund.

They ranked tenth in the final standings.

Competitive history 

The table below contains individual game results for the team in international matches and competitions.

Goal scoring by competition

See also 

 Disabled sports
 Sweden at the Paralympics

References

Goalball women's
National women's goalball teams
European national goalball teams